Mastram is an 2020 Indian erotic drama streaming television series on MX Player. It stars Anshuman Jha, Tara Alisha Berry. Now this web series has been removed from the MX Player because of the adult content, since Indian government released new OTT Platform Rules

Episodes

Season 2

Cast
 Anshuman Jha as Rajaram
 Tara Alisha Berry as Madhu
 Jagat Singh Rawat as Mamaji
 Aakash Dabhade as Gopal
 Rani Chatterjee as Rani
 Kenisha Awasthi as Miss Rita
 Aabha Paul as Sarita Nair
 Ashmita Jaggi  as Inspector Gayatri "Geetu"
 Garima Jain as Abhinetri Indurekha
 Isha Chhabra as Madhu's Bua
 Amrita Das Gupta as Chhoti Bahu
 Kamalika Chanda  as Secretary
 Harshitha Khuswaha as Asha
 Nehal Vadoliya as Nanda
Vipin Sharma as Durga Prasad
Ravi Sharma as Vishambar (Madhu's Father)
Vivek Jha as Golu dhobi
victoria as english teen girl.
Benieal as benny

References

External links

2020 Indian television series debuts
Hindi-language web series
Indian web series
Indian pornography
Indian drama web series
Television series set in the 1980s
Television series based on actual events